Nikita Lyamkin (born February 6, 1996) is a Russian professional ice hockey defenceman currently playing with Ak Bars Kazan in the Kontinental Hockey League (KHL). He is a one-time Russian Champion.

Awards and honours

References

External links

1996 births
Living people
Ak Bars Kazan players
Bars Kazan players
Chicoutimi Saguenéens (QMJHL) players
Metallurg Novokuznetsk players
Sportspeople from Barnaul